The International Lunar Observatory (ILO) is a private scientific and commercial lunar mission by International Lunar Observatory Association (ILOA) of Kamuela, Hawaii to place a small observatory near the South Pole of the Moon to conduct astrophysical studies using an optical telescope. The mission, planned for launch in 2022 or 2023, aims to prove a conceptual design for a lunar observatory that would be reliable, low cost, and fast to implement. A precursor mission, ILO-X consisting of two small imagers (totaling less than 0.6 kg), is set to launch in 2022 aboard the Intuitive Machines IM-1 mission to Vallis Schröteri on the Moon's near side. It is hoped to be a technology precursor to a future observatories on the Moon, and other commercial initiatives.

The ILO-1 mission, announced in July 2017, is being organized by the International Lunar Observatory Association (ILOA) and the Space Age Publishing Company. The prime contractors originally were Moon Express, providing the MX-1E lander, and Canadensys Aerospace, providing the optical telescope system. The estimated cost in 2004 was of US$50 million.

Overview

The ILO-1 mission, first planned to be launched in 2008, was later scheduled to be launched in July 2020 with an Electron rocket from New Zealand. The mission was called Moon Express Lunar Scout, and it would have used the MX-1E lander to deliver the observatory on top of the Malapert Mountain, a 5 km tall peak in the Aitken Basin region that has an uninterrupted direct line of sight to Earth, which facilitates communications any time. The original launch of the MX-1E lander with an Electron rocket was cancelled sometime before February 2020; no launch date or launch rocket for the MX-1E has been since announced, leaving the status of it unknown. The ILO-1 flagship payload, and its back up ILO-2, is still being advanced through work by Canadensys Aerospace Corporation (April 2022) while ILOA seeks a different landing provider and partner to land on Malapert Mountain. ILO-1 or ILO-2 may fly with Intuitive Machines to the Moon South Pole region in December 2022 / 2023 aboard IM-2, or fly with other international or national lunar missions currently under development.  

The small robotic ILO-1 observatory is designed to withstand the long lunar nights so it is expected to operate for a few years. Moon Express would have also utilized the mission to explore the Moon's South Pole for mineral resources including water ice. The original plan for the ILO-1 included an optical portion of the system is a Schmidt–Cassegrain telescope. The optical system uses a 7 cm diameter lens, with an 18 cm focal plane, a 13 cm  f/5.6 aperture, and 6.4-megapixel resolution. The telescope system would have been "about the size of a shoe-box" with a mass of approximately 2 kg.

Some collaborators include the National Astronomical Observatory of China (NAOC), Indian Space Research Organisation (ISRO), the newly formed Southeast Asia Principal Operating Partnership, and others.

Objective

The mission's objective is to conduct astrophysical observations from the surface of the Moon, whose lack of atmosphere eliminates much of the need for costly adaptive optics technology. Also, since the Moon's days (about fourteen Earth days) have a dark sky, it allows for nonstop astronomical observations. Disadvantages include micrometeorite impacts, cosmic and solar radiation, lunar dust, and temperature shifts as large as 350° Celsius.  The mission aims to acquire images of galaxies, stars, planets, the Moon and Earth. The project will promote commercial access to the telescope use to schools, scientists and the public at large through the Internet.

See also
List of artificial objects on the Moon
List of missions to the Moon
Lunar Ultraviolet Cosmic Imager, a proposed lunar-based telescope

References

External links
ILO-X and ILO-X Commercial Missions at Canadyensis Aerospace
Photo of the telescope.
History of Lunar-Based Astronomy at Space Age Publishing Co.

Missions to the Moon
Space telescopes
Spacecraft instruments
2020s in spaceflight